Richard Shaw (19 November 1920 – 11 April 2010) was an English actor remembered for appearing in the science fiction franchises Quatermass and Doctor Who, as well as having a regular role as henchman Ryan in the children's series Freewheelers.

Shaw appeared in the 1959 TV serial of Quatermass and the Pit playing drill operator Sladden. He was asked to reprise the role in the 1967 film adaptation but was unable to do so due to other commitments. Duncan Lamont (from The Quatermass Experiment) was therefore cast instead. Shaw made three appearances in Doctor Who: The Space Museum, Frontier in Space and Underworld. Outside of work, it seems Richard might have believed in the existence of alien lizards and UFOs.

Amongst the other television shows the actor appeared in were The Adventures of William Tell, No Hiding Place, International Detective, Ghost Squad, Z-Cars, Sir Francis Drake, Richard the Lionheart, Dixon of Dock Green, Steptoe and Son, Sykes and a..., The Saint, The Wednesday Play, Emergency Ward 10, King of the River, Crossroads, Softly, Softly, Please Sir!, Pathfinders, The Capone Investment, Softly, Softly: Task Force, Barlow at Large, The Hanged Man, ...And Mother Makes Five, The Onedin Line, The Famous Five, The Sandbaggers, Robin's Nest, George and Mildred, Coronation Street and Matlock.

Filmography

 The Hour of 13 (1952) - The 'Terror'
 The Gambler and the Lady (1953) - Louis
 Black Orchid (1953) - Lorry Driver
 West of Suez a.k.a. The Fighting Wildcats (1957) - Cross
 The Crooked Sky (1957) - Williams
 Hour of Decision (1957) - Sgt. Dale
 Date with Disaster (1957) - Ken Prescott
 Booby Trap (1957) - Richards
 The Big Chance (1957) - Airport Official
 Man from Tangier a.k.a. Thunder over Tangier (1957) - Johnny
 Morning Call a.k.a. The Strange Case of Dr. Manning (1957) - Drunk at cemetery
 The Man Who Wouldn't Talk (1958) - Inspector Barclay
 The Safecracker (1958) - Bailey
 A Night to Remember (1958) - Crewman (uncredited)
 Man with a Gun (1958) - Jim Lyde
 Hidden Homicide (1959) - Wright
 First Man into Space (1959) - Witney
 No Trees in the Street (1959) - Reg
 The House of the Seven Hawks (1959) - Police Sgt. Straatman
 Bottoms Up (1960) - 2nd Man
 The Challenge a.k.a. It Takes a Thief (1960) - Lorry Driver
 Circle of Deception (1960) - Liebert
 Compelled (1960) - Jug
 Highway to Battle (1961) - Franz
 Partners in Crime (1961) - Bill Cross
 The Pot Carriers (1962) - Prison Officer Willis
 The Cracksman (1963) - Moke
 633 Squadron (1964) - Johanson (uncredited)
 The Spy Who Came In from the Cold (1965) - Guard (uncredited)
 Don't Lose Your Head (1967) - Captain of Soldiers
 The Dirty Dozen (1967) - German Officer Who Seals the Bunker (uncredited)
 Groupie Girl a.k.a. I Am a Groupie (1970) - Morrie
 Give Us Tomorrow (1978) - 1st Bank Robber
 Young Toscanini (1988) - Comparsa

References

External links
 

1920 births
2010 deaths
English male film actors
English male television actors